The Mind of Mr. Soames is a 1970 British-American sci-fi–drama film directed by Alan Cooke and starring Terence Stamp, Robert Vaughn and Nigel Davenport about a man who awakens from a 30 year coma with an immature brain. The film is based on Charles Eric Maine's 1961 novel of the same name.

Plot 
John Soames is a thirty-year-old man who has been in a coma since a brain injury during birth. Now revived, he shows the behaviour of a child and is monitored by two doctors attempting to find out if he can be rehabilitated into the adult world. One English doctor, Dr. Maitland, is only interested in educational activities and he works John until he stops interacting and refuses to eat. Another doctor, the American Dr. Bergen suggests play for its own sake would have benefits and he brings a bouncy ball into John's room. John is soon interacting again and eating once more.

During all this time, John has met no women, nor any schooling in morality. Eventually, John is allowed outside into the natural world by Dr. Bergen and he delights in it, drinking water from a pool by dipping his head in. Dr. Maitland finds out and returns John to his room. Again, John becomes distressed. The men talk to him a great deal but John has fewer words, and although he appears to understand, when he is told to wait six months until he goes outside again, he does not know how long that will be.

John breaks free, having struck an orderly with a wooden chair and knocked him out, nearly killing him. He runs through woods until he reaches a river where he sleeps. The next day, he sees a busy road for the first time. A man stops his car thinking he is a hitch-hiker. The man chats whilst John is silent. John gets out, finds a pub and helps himself to some food without paying. A woman offers him a drink, a glass of bitter that John spits out on the floor that attracts intense attention from the pub crawlers. A man comes to help the barmaid, saying he owes money. John is ejected from the pub.

He passes a school playground and attempts to join a group of children who are playing with a ball. John takes the ball where he creates a scene with the schoolchildren and their teacher. He runs away once again and it gets dark.

John helps himself a coat from a car parked outside someone's house. The owner shouts at him, John runs and is hit by a car. The couple stop and get him into their car. The woman wants to take him to a hospital but the man says they'll call the police (he has been drinking), so they drive John to their house. The woman puts him in the spare bedroom.

The next day, the woman offers to clean him, and asks what he remembers. John says a few words and the woman thinks he is in shock. She suggests he was injured by an unknown hit-and-run driver, and the woman found him by the side of the road. John eats breakfast and the woman announces his name - she has seen a newspaper. She says he is wanted for attempted murder upon the orderly. She accepts that he was locked up by bad people. John touches her hair and she says she cannot recall the last time her husband was half as gentle.

John leaves before the police come to the house but . He manages to get a train ticket and uses money from the coat he has on. The doctors are still in pursuit. On the train, John talks very slowly to a nervous teenaged girl  with his limited vocabulary. The girl drops her violin and as John goes to help her he puts his hand on hers and the girl screams repeatedly and pulls the emergency brake. As the train stops, John hops off and runs away through the countryside with the girl telling a guard that John tried to attack her.

Eventually, the police use dogs to follow John across the countryside to a barn. The doctors arrive. Maitland threatens to 'get angry' if he doesn't come out. The other doctor, Bergen, says to be calm. He goes in and speaks to John and realises John has hurt his leg (falling from the train). Bergen offers medicine from his car and says he won't force John to go with him, it is John's decision. John asks him not to go and then follows him out into the rain. Meanwhile, two young journalists reporting on John's history from the institute are watching from a car. The man's hand is poised over a switch.

Suddenly, a bright light dazzles John and the dogs start barking. In panic, John spins round and round with the pitchfork he holds. He lets go and it spins out, hitting Bergen. When John realizes what he has done, he broke into tears and collapses. People step forward and place him on a stretcher. Bergen is in pain but all right. Bergen's assistant gets into the van beside John and says his name kindly. John, who looks traumatised, gradually turns to look at him and reaches out a hand. Bergen's assistant takes it. They drive away leaving Maitland standing in the rain until the two students drive over to pick him up.

Cast 
 Terence Stamp as John Soames
 Robert Vaughn as Doctor Michael Bergen
 Nigel Davenport as Doctor Maitland
 Christian Roberts as Thomas Fleming
 Donal Donnelly as Joe Allan
 Norman Jones as Davis
 Dan Jackson as Nicholls
 Vickery Turner as Naomi
 Judy Parfitt as Jenny Bannerman
 Scott Forbes as Richard Bannerman
 Joe McPartland as Inspector Moore
 Pamela Moiseiwitsch as Melanie Parks
 Billy Cornelius as Sergeant Clifford

Production 
The Mind of Mr. Soames was an attempt by Amicus Productions to branch into the non-horror field (they had also tried to option the rights to Flowers for Algernon but had been unable to secure them). The large budget was provided by Columbia Pictures.

Release 
The film was released in theatres on 12 October 1970 in the United States, 26 March 1971 in Ireland, 18 June 1971 in Mexico. It was released on DVD by Sony Pictures Home Entertainment on 4 March 2011.

Reception

Box office 
The Mind of Mr. Soames was a failure at the box office.

Critical response 
Roger Greenspun of The New York Times wrote in his review:

Hal Erickson of Rovi wrote, on Rotten Tomatoes: "The Mind of Mr. Soames can be described as a melodramatic Charly. John Soames (Terence Stamp) is a hospital patient who has been in a coma for 30 years. Doctor Bergen (Robert Vaughn) attempts to revitalize Soames by transplanting an infant's brain in the patient's head. When Soames awakens, he has the mental capacity of a baby, but Dr. Bergen is certain that he can accelerate the maturation process, which he does in a matter of weeks. But the pressure on Soames' emotional stability is such that he tragically snaps during a live TV broadcast. Adapted from a novel by Charles Eric Maine, The Mind of Mr. Soames raises more questions than it can possibly answer, but works well on the level of solid science fiction."

Note the review from Rotten Tomatoes is incorrect as there was not an actual transplant of a baby's brain.

References

Sources

External links 
 
 The Mind of Mr Soames at British Horror Films

1970 films
British science fiction drama films
American science fiction drama films
1970s science fiction drama films
Films directed by Alan Cooke
Films based on British novels
Amicus Productions films
Columbia Pictures films
1970s English-language films
1970s American films
1970s British films